The Zeros were one of the early English punk groups, as chronicled in Henrik Poulsen's book 77: The Year of Punk and New Wave.

Career
Originally a trio, they were led by Steve Godfrey (guitar/vocals, b.1959, Walthamstow, London), the cousin of Jerry Shirley of Humble Pie. The two other members were Phil Gaylor (drums/vocals) and Steve Cotton (bass/vocals). They released a single called "Hungry" in November 1977 on the Small Wonder Records label. "Hungry" was No 1 in the NME punk chart. That same month, they recorded four songs, including "Hungry," for BBC Radio 1 with John Peel. Paul Miller (guitar/vocals) joined in early 1978. The same year Hugh Stanley Clark became their manager and re signed the band to "The Label". They released a second single a year later, "What's Wrong with Pop Group".

Somewhere in the 2000s, Steve Godfrey created a Myspace page, and posted The Zeros entire discography as well as a series of previously unheard recording sessions and demos.

Discography

7" singles
1977 - "Hungry" b/w "Radio Fun" (Small Wonder Records)
1979 - "What's Wrong with Pop Group" featured on the "What's Wrong with Pop Group" / "Decisions" split single. (ROK Records) (b/w "Decisions" by Action Replay)
2018 - Lost Boys : 1977-1979 (Only Fit For The Bin Records)

See also
Timeline of punk rock
List of Peel sessions
List of British punk bands

References

External links 
The Zeros (UK) Myspace page
The Zeros - Discogs.com

English punk rock groups
British musical trios
Musical quartets
Musical groups established in 1977
Musical groups disestablished in 1979